In quantum field theory, a composite field is a field defined in terms of other more "elementary" fields. It might describe a composite particle (bound state) or it might not. It might be local, or it might be nonlocal. Noether fields are often composite fields and they are local.

In the generalized LSZ formalism, composite fields, which are usually nonlocal, are used to model asymptotic bound states.

See also 

 Fermionic field
 Bosonic field
 Auxiliary field

Quantum field theory